Thunder Live is the third album and first live album released by jazz fusion group Casiopea in 1980. This album marked the first appearance of drummer Akira Jimbo, who replaced Takashi Sasaki that same year.

Track listing
All tunes arranged by Issei Noro.

Personnel
CASIOPEA are
Issei Noro - Electric guitar (Yamaha SG-2000)
Minoru Mukaiya - Keyboards (Yamaha CP-80 and CS-40M, Fender Rhodes Piano, Korg 800DV and PS-3200, Roland VP-330 and ProMars)
Tetsuo Sakurai - Bass (Fender Electric Bass, Yamaha BB-2000)
Akira Jimbo - Drums (Yamaha YD-9000R)

Production
Executive Producer - Kunihiko Murai, Syoro Kawazoe
producer - Shunsuke Miyazumi, Shinji Sawada
Recording andMixing engineer - Norio Yoshizawa, Yasuhiko Terada, Katsuhiko Sato
Recorded live at ABC Hall, Shiba, Tokyo on February 8 and 9, 1980.
Art Director - Yukimasa Okumura
Design - Tomohiro Itami
Illustrator - Makoto Saito
Cover coordination - Toshinao Tsukui
Remastering engineer - Kouji Suzuki (2016)

Release history

References

External links
 
 

1980 live albums
Casiopea live albums
Alfa Records live albums